Armada is an extinct town in Crawford County, in the U.S. state of Arkansas.

History
A post office called Armada was established in 1888, and remained in operation until 1943. Armada was a shipping point of timber and fruits.

References

Geography of Crawford County, Arkansas
Ghost towns in Arkansas